Uto Wunderlich (born 27 January 1946) is a German former sports shooter. He competed at the 1968 Summer Olympics and the 1972 Summer Olympics for East Germany.

References

1946 births
Living people
German male sport shooters
Olympic shooters of East Germany
Shooters at the 1968 Summer Olympics
Shooters at the 1972 Summer Olympics
Sportspeople from Leipzig
20th-century German people